Simeon Olcott (October 1, 1735February 22, 1815) was a New Hampshire attorney and politician.  His career began before the American Revolution and continued afterwards, and among the positions in which he served were Chief Judge of the New Hampshire Supreme Court (1795-1801) and United States Senator from New Hampshire (1801-1805).

A native of Bolton, Connecticut, Olcott graduated from Yale College in 1761, studied law, attained admission to the bar, and began to practice in Charlestown, New Hampshire.  He quickly became active in politics and government, and served as a town selectman, town meeting moderator, and member of the colonial legislature.  He served as Cheshire County Probate Judge during the American Revolution, and when several western New Hampshire towns attempted to join Vermont after the war, Olcott served as an associate justice of the Vermont Supreme Court.  The attempted union was soon dissolved, and Olcott served on New Hampshire's Court of Common Pleas (1784-1790), as a judge of the Superior Court (later renamed the state Supreme Court) (1790-1795), and chief judge of the Superior Court (1795-1801).  In 1801, Olcott was selected to fill the U.S. Senate vacancy created after Samuel Livermore resigned, and he served from 1801 to 1805.

Olcott died in Charlestown in 1815 and was buried at Forest Hill Cemetery in Charlestown.

Early life
Olcott was born in Bolton, Connecticut Colony, and was a son of Timothy Olcott and Eunice (White) Olcott.  He graduated from Yale College in 1761, studied law, was admitted to the bar and commenced practice in Charlestown, New Hampshire.

Start of career
Olcott served in several local offices, including selectman (1769-1770, 1771) and member of the provincial legislature (1771-1774). In 1770 and 1772, Olcott was elected as Charlestown's town meeting moderator.  In 1773, Olcott was appointed judge of probate for Cheshire County, and he served throughout the American Revolution.  In 1781, several western New Hampshire towns voted to leave New Hampshire and join Vermont.  Several residents of these towns were appointed or elected to Vermont offices, including Olcott, who was chosen as an Associate Justice of the Vermont Supreme Court. The union between New Hampshire's Connecticut River towns and Vermont was soon nullified, and Olcott resigned as an associate justice in 1782.

Later career
In 1784, Olcott was appointed chief justice of the New Hampshire Court of Common Pleas.  He held this position until 1790, when he was appointed a judge of the New Hampshire Superior Court (later renamed the New Hampshire Supreme Court.  He served until 1795, when he was appointed chief judge, and he held this position until 1801.  When the country's first political parties were created, Olcott became identified with the Federalists.

Samuel Livermore resigned his seat in the United States Senate in 1801.  The New Hampshire General Court chose Olcott to fill the vacancy, and he served from June 17, 1801 to March 3, 1805.

Death and burial
Olcott retired at the completion of his U.S. Senate term and continued to reside in Charlestown.  He died in Charlestown on February 22, 1815.  He was buried at Forest Hill Cemetery in Charlestown.

Family
In 1783, Olcott married Tryphena Terry of Enfield, Connecticut.  They were the parents of three children, a son George who died in infancy, a second son named George (1785-1764), who was the longtime cashier of the Connecticut River Bank, and Henry, a career officer in the United States Marine Corps who died in 1821.

References

Sources

Books

Internet

External links

1735 births
1815 deaths
People from Bolton, Connecticut
New Hampshire state court judges
United States senators from New Hampshire
Chief Justices of the New Hampshire Supreme Court
Yale College alumni
New Hampshire Federalists
Federalist Party United States senators
People from Charlestown, New Hampshire